The Clorox Building is a 24-story,  High-rise building in the City Center complex of downtown Oakland, California. The building was completed in 1976, and designed by Cesar Pelli when he worked with Gruen Associates now based in Los Angeles. The Oakland-based Clorox Company is headquartered in the building.

See also

List of tallest buildings in Oakland, California

References

External links
 The Clorox Company

Headquarters in the United States
Skyscraper office buildings in Oakland, California
César Pelli buildings
Office buildings completed in 1976
1976 establishments in California
Clorox brands